The 1876 Melbourne Cup was a two-mile handicap horse race which took place on Tuesday, 7 November 1876.

This year was the sixteenth running of the Melbourne Cup. The race is most famous for winning jockey Peter St. Albans (real name: Micheal Bowden) who became the youngest Melbourne Cup winning jockey at 12 (he was actually a few days shy of his 11th birthday). Briseis, who won the Doncaster Handicap at two, won by two lengths and was the first of three fillies to win the race the Cup. She also completed the VRC Derby and Melbourne Cup double. Briseis won in a field of 33 and "The boy who rode the winner was carried around the pack and is the hero of the day" reported the Australasian Sketcher. Both Peter St Albans and Briseis have now become racing legends.

This is the list of placegetters for the 1876 Melbourne Cup.

See also

 Melbourne Cup
 List of Melbourne Cup winners
 Victoria Racing Club
 Australian Racing Hall of Fame

References

External links
1876 Melbourne Cup footyjumpers.com

1876
Melbourne Cup
Melbourne Cup
19th century in Melbourne
1870s in Melbourne